Ali Mahmoud Abbas (born 2 November 1964 in Efra) is a Syrian politician, senior Syrian Arab Army lieutenant general and the 14th Minister of Defense of the Syrian Arab Republic, succeeding Ali Abdullah Ayyoub.

References 

1964 births
Living people
People from Rif Dimashq Governorate
Syrian generals
Syrian ministers of defense